Dança dos Famosos 2018 was the fifteenth season of the Brazilian reality television show Dança dos Famosos which premiered on August 12, 2018, with the competitive live shows beginning on the following week on August 19, 2018 at 7:30 / 6:30 p.m. (BRT / AMT) on Rede Globo.

On December 16, 2018, singer and actor Léo Jaime & Larissa Parison won the competition over actress Érika Januza & Elias Ustariz and comedian Dani Calabresa & Reginaldo Sama, who took 2nd and 3rd place respectively.

Couples

Elimination chart

Key
 
 
  Eliminated
  Saved last
  Dance-off
  Withdrew
  Third place
  Runner-up
  Winner

Weekly results

Week 1 

 Presentation of the Celebrities

Aired: August 12, 2018

Week 2 
Week 1 – Men
Style: Disco
Aired: August 19, 2018

Running order

Week 3 
Week 1 – Women
Style: Disco
Aired: August 26, 2018

Running order

Week 4 
Week 2 – Men
Style: Forró
Aired: September 2, 2018

Running order

Week 5 
Week 2 – Women
Style: Forró
Aired: September 9, 2018

Running order

Week 6 
Week 3 – Men
Style: Funk
Aired: September 16, 2018

Running order

Week 7 
Week 3 – Women
Style: Funk
Aired: September 23, 2018

Running order

Week 8 
Week 4 – Men
Style: Rock and Roll
Aired: September 30, 2018

Running order

Week 9 
Week 4 – Women
Style: Rock and Roll
Aired: October 7, 2018

Running order

Week 10 
Week 5 – Men
Style: Country
Aired: October 14, 2018

Running order

Week 11 
Week 5 – Women
Style: Country
Aired: October 21, 2018

Running order

Week 12 
Dance-off
Style: Zouk
Aired: November 4, 2018

Running order

Week 13 
Group 1
Style: Salsa
Aired: November 11, 2018

Running order

Week 14 
Group 2
Style: Salsa
Aired: November 18, 2018

Running order

Week 15 
Top 6
Style: Pasodoble
Aired: November 25, 2018

Running order

Week 16 
Top 5 – Semifinals
Style: Samba
Aired: December 2, 2018

Running order

Week 17 
Top 3 – Finals
Styles: Tango & Waltz
Aired: December 16, 2018

Running order

References

External links
 

2018 Brazilian television seasons
Season 15